Peter Rockwell (September 16, 1936 – February 6, 2020) was an American sculptor, and the author of several books about stone carving. He was associated with the Norman Rockwell Museum, named for his father.

Early life
Rockwell was born on September 16, 1936, in New Rochelle, New York, the son of Mary Barstow and painter and illustrator Norman Rockwell. Rockwell grew up in Vermont, where he was educated at The Putney School. He graduated from Haverford College in 1958, and he later attended the  Pennsylvania Academy of the Fine Arts.

Career
Rockwell became a sculptor in Rome, Italy, where he spent most of his adult life. His father was initially reluctant to see his son pursue sculpture as a profession. Rockwell left Rome after the death of his wife in 2013 and produced sculptures at the Clay Dreaming Pottery Studio in Beverly, Massachusetts. He authored several books about stone carving.

Rockwell was associated with the Norman Rockwell Museum, named for his father, where he exhibited his work. His work was also examined in The Art of Making in Antiquity: Stoneworking in the Roman World, a research project at King's College London.

His sculptures can be seen in the United States at the National Portrait Gallery, the Washington National Cathedral, Boston College, the Cathedral of the Pines. They are also held in a convent in Chioggia, Italy and at the headquarters of the International Centre for the Study of the Preservation and Restoration of Cultural Property in Rome.

Personal life and death
Rockwell married Cynthia Ide, and they had four children. He died on February 6, 2020, in Danvers, Massachusetts. During the final years of his life, he lived in Beverly, Massachusetts and attended St. Peter’s Episcopal Church in Beverly. In 2018, Peter had the Norman Rockwell Museum hang his Stations of the Cross woodcuts in the church for a temporary exhibition during Lent and Easter. The church hosted an opening reception and Peter gave an artist’s talk to the assembled crowd. His Memorial Eucharist was held at St. Paul's Within the Walls, the American Episcopal church in Rome on May 4, 2022; the service had been delayed two years by the Covid19 pandemic. Peter faithfully attended that church during his many years in Rome, even served as Senior Warden. Peter created many sculptures for the church, including a crucifix that hangs in the nave, a series of striking woodcuts of the Stations of the cross, also installed in the nave. Many unique stone sculptures that he created can be seen in the church’s garden. At his urging, the church became a place for artists to display their work.

Selected works

Books

Further reading

References

1936 births
2020 deaths
People from New Rochelle, New York
People from Beverly, Massachusetts
American expatriates in Italy
American male sculptors
Haverford College alumni
Pennsylvania Academy of the Fine Arts alumni
Sculptors from Massachusetts
20th-century American sculptors
20th-century American male artists
21st-century American sculptors
21st-century American male artists